Kiliwa may refer to:
 Kiliwa people, an ethnic group of Mexico
 Kiliwa language, their language